The Dečani chrysobulls alternatively known as the Dečani charters are chrysobulls dating to 1330-1345 which contain a detailed list of landholdings and tax farming rights which the monastery of Visoki Dečani held over settlements and communities in the Kingdom of Serbia, in an area which spanned from present-day southern Serbia, Kosovo, Montenegro and parts of northern Albania. The chrysobulls were signed by Stefan Dečanski, the King of Serbia, who confirmed the existing rights and gave new ones to the monastery.

Content  
The chrysobulls consist in three charters which were written at different times. It contains an introductory part in Serbian Church Slavonic presenting theological content, the reasons why the King decided to build a new place of worship, and an important section outlining the King's ancestors on which Stefan Dečanski bases his own right on the Serbian throne, before ending the introduction with his autobiography. The central part of the charter, the largest, is written in the Serbian vernacular and focuses first on the King's gifts to the monastery (books, crosses, vases, clothes, etc.), before listing the various villages given to the monastery, with their boundaries. The inhabitants who had to work for the monastery were also mentioned, as well as the rules that they were required to respect. The eschatol, the last part of the first charter, is written again in Serbian Church Slavonic and mentions the council during which the endowments of the monastery were approved and finalized. The court dignitaries present at the Dečani assembly were the kaznac, tepčija, vojvoda, sluga and stavilac. At the end of the charter, reference is made to the Battle of Velbuzhd, which took place on 28 July 1330 and in which Stefan Dečanski's army defeated the troops of the Bulgarian king, Michael Shishman. 

The chrysobulls did not list every settlement in the domain of Serbian kings, but only those whose taxes were directly used for the benefit of the monastery. The chrysobulls listed that Visoki Dečani held such rights over 2,097 households of meropsi (dependent farmers-serfs), 266 Vlach households (pastoral communities) and 69 sokalnici (craftsmen). About 90% of the inhabitants of the settlements listed in the second and third charters had Slavic names, which implies that these settlements were mainly inhabited by Serbs. Besides the villages, the settlements also included 9 Vlach and one Albanian katuns. Appart this Albanian katun, two villages had a characteristic Albanian anthroponymy, these were Greva in Altin and Kuševo in Zeta. Most of the Albanians at the time were Catholic and as such might not have been listed in the documents of Serbian Orthodox monasteries. Some of those listed as “Vlachs” might have actually been Albanian-speakers.

Annotations

References

Sources
 
 
 
 
 

Golden Bulls
Medieval charters and cartularies of Serbia
14th century in Serbia
Nemanjić dynasty
Demographic history of Serbia